Eriskirch is a municipality in the Bodensee district of Baden-Württemberg, Germany.

History

Geography
The municipality (Gemeinde) of Eriskirch is found in the Bodensee district of Baden-Württemberg, one of the 16 States of the Federal Republic of Germany. Eriskirch lies at the southeast edge of the district, on the shores of Lake Constance, whose  most characterizes the municipal area's landscape. The shore of Lake Constance within Eriskirch's municipal area is covered by an alluvial forest. Elevation above sea level in the municipal area ranges from a high of  Normalnull (NN) to a low of  NN by Lake Constance.

A portion of the Federally protected  nature reserve is located in Eriskirch's municipal area.

Politics
Eriskirch has one borough, Eriskirch, and 16 villages: Braitenrain, Dillmannshof, Gmünd, Hofstatt, Knöbelhof, Langenacker, Mariabrunn, Moos, Oberbaumgarten, Röcken, Schlatt, Schoppenhof, Schussenreute, Unterbaumgarten, Wolfzennen, and Ziegelhaus. In addition, the abandoned villages of Adelshofen, Mönchloh, and Vogelsang are located in the municipal area.

Coat of arms
Eriskirch's coat of arms is divided in half party per pale into a left, blue and a right, yellow half. In the blue field is a fleur de lis, adopted as a municipal motif around 1936. Opposite it is a church, with white walls and a blue roof, referring to the name of the municipality. This coat of arms was awarded by the provisional post-World War II Württemberg-Hohenzollern government on 30 June 1952 and again by the Bodensee district office on 10 April 1981. Accompanying the second awarding was a municipal flag.

References

External links

  (in German)

Bodenseekreis